Fiers may refer to:

 Alan Fiers (born 1939), American Central Intelligence Agency official
 Mike Fiers (born 1985), American professional baseball player
 Nadine Fiers (born 1966), Belgian racing cyclist
 Walter Fiers (1931–2019), Belgian molecular biologist
 Gustav Fiers, a Marvel Comics supervillain and enemy of Spider-Man known by the alias "the Gentleman"

See also
 Fier, Albania
 Fires